Big Lake station is a Northstar Line commuter rail station in Big Lake, Minnesota, located at 19691 County Road 43, in the southeast corner of Big Lake near U.S. Highway 10. The station features bicycle lockers and a park and ride lot with capacity for 518 vehicles. Commute time to downtown Minneapolis from this station is about 51 minutes.

This station is the northbound terminus until funding for an extension to St. Cloud is secured. In the meantime, a commuter bus branded the Northstar Link (route 887) connects Big Lake with St. Cloud, stopping at the Metro Bus downtown transit center, St. Cloud State University, a commuter parking lot at Lincoln Avenue and U.S. Highway 10 and the Coffee Cup Cafe in Becker. The bus is operated by St. Cloud Metro Bus, rather than Metro Transit.

The maintenance facility for the Northstar trains was built just to the south.

Notes

External links

Big Lake Station, Northstar Corridor Development Authority (NCDA)

Buildings and structures in Sherburne County, Minnesota
Northstar Line stations
Railway stations in the United States opened in 2009
Transportation in Sherburne County, Minnesota
2009 establishments in Minnesota